Met, MET, The Met or The MET may refer to:

Buildings

Arts venues
 Metropolitan Museum of Art, or the Met, in New York City 
 Manhattan Ensemble Theatre, or MET, in New York City
 Metropolitan Opera, or the Met, in New York City
 Metropolitan Opera House (disambiguation), various buildings
 The Met (arts centre) in Bury, Greater Manchester
 Manila Metropolitan Theater in Manila, Philippines

Sports venues
 Met Center in Bloomington, Minnesota
 Met Park in Norfolk, Virginia
 MetLife Stadium in East Rutherford, New Jersey
 Metropolitan Stadium in Bloomington, Minnesota

Other buildings 
 Metropolitan Bible Church ("The MET"), Ottawa, Canada 
 Metropolitan Building (Minneapolis), until 1961
 Metropolitan Miami (development), Florida, US
 Metropolitan Theatre (Winnipeg), Canada
 The Met (skyscraper), Bangkok, Thailand

Arts, entertainment, and media
 Met, a fictitious character in Mega Man (v-game) series
 Met 107, a radio station in Bangkok
 Mind's Eye Theatre, a live-action role-playing game
 The Met: Policing London, BBC documentary series

Brands and enterprises
 MetLife, insurance provider
 Metropolitan Stores, former Canadian chain
 MET Group, a Hungarian-Swiss energy company

Education 
 Budapest Metropolitan University, formerly Budapest College of Communication and Business
 Manchester Metropolitan University, England, UK
 Michigan English Test, U.S./British language exam
 Muslim Educational Trust

Meteorological agencies
 Met Éireann, Ireland
 Met Office, UK

Policing 
Metropolitan Police Service of London, UK

Science, technology, and mathematics

Biology and medicine  
 Mesenchymal–epithelial transition
 MET (gene), encoding hepatocyte growth factor receptor
 Met, hypermethioninemia
 Metabolic Equivalent of Task, the physical intensity of an activity
 Microbial electrochemical technologies

Chemical species
 Methionine, amino acid abbreviated as Met, or M
 Methylethyltryptamine, hallucinogen

Patient-focused terms
 Metabolic equivalent of task, in fitness
 Motivational enhancement therapy
 Muscle energy technique, clinical neuromuscular protocol

Space missions
Mission Elapsed Time, a method of timekeeping during space missions
 Modular Equipment Transporter (Apollo program), lunar handcart

Other science and technology, and mathematics
 Met (mathematics), category of metric spaces having metric maps
 Met, unit of metabolic rate 
 MET Matrix, materials, energy, and toxic emissions
 Missing transverse energy in particle physics
 Microwave electrothermal thruster, a form of electric spacecraft propulsion

Transport 
 Nash Metropolitan automobile
 London Underground:
 Metropolitan line  
 Metropolitan Railway, originating company
 Metropolitan Electric Tramways, tram company in London
 Metropolitan Transit Authority of Black Hawk County in Waterloo, Iowa, United States
 Modesto and Empire Traction Company, a shortline railroad
 Metlink, metropolitan transit marketing agency for Melbourne, Australia
 Metropolitan West Side Elevated Railroad, one of the predecessors of the Chicago "L" system

Other uses
 Mediterranean Editors and Translators association
 Middle European Time or Central European Time

See also
 Mets (disambiguation)